SPHEREx (Spectro-Photometer for the History of the Universe, Epoch of Reionization, and Ices Explorer)  is a future near-infrared space observatory that will perform an all-sky survey to measure the near-infrared spectra of approximately 450 million galaxies. In February 2019, SPHEREx was selected by NASA for its next Medium-Class Explorers mission, beating out two competing mission concepts: Arcus and FINESSE. , SPHEREx is targeted to launch no earlier than April 2025 on a Falcon 9 launch vehicle from Vandenberg Space Force Base. The principal investigator is James Bock at California Institute of Technology (Caltech) in Pasadena, California.

Overview

Mission
SPHEREx will use a spectrophotometer to perform an all-sky survey that will measure near-infrared spectra from 0.75 to 5.0 micrometers. It will employ a single instrument with a single observing mode and no moving parts to map the entire sky (in 96 
different color bands, far exceeding the color resolution of previous all-sky maps) four times during its nominal 25-month mission; the crucial technology is a linear variable filter, as demonstrated by LEISA on New Horizons.

It will classify galaxies according to redshift accuracy, categorizing approximately 450 million galaxies and fitting measured spectra to a library of galaxy templates. Specifically, SPHEREx will probe signals from the intra-halo light and from the epoch of reionization. It would explore what drove the early universe inflation, explore the origin and history of galaxies, and explore the origin of water in planetary systems.

SPHEREx will complement planned Euclid and Nancy Grace Roman Space Telescope spectroscopic surveys. High precision redshift information of foreground galaxies provided by SPHEREx in correspondence with weak gravitational lensing measurements of background galaxies from Euclid and Nancy Grace Roman Space Telescope will allow a for a direct measurement of the dark matter distribution surrounding the foreground galaxies. Although, the SPHEREx low redshift survey allows its measurement of inflationary parameters to be mostly independent to provide a new line of evidence.

Spacecraft/telescope
The triple mirror telescope will have an aperture diameter of 20 centimeters with a 3.5° x 11° field of view and six 2k x 2k mercury cadmium telluride (HgCdTe) photodetector arrays. Each 2K x 2K focal plane array is covered with a linear variable filter, providing narrow-band response with a band center that varies along one axis of the array. SPHEREx obtains spectra through multiple exposures, placing a given source at multiple positions in the field of view, where it is measured at multiple wavelengths by repointing the spacecraft.

The SPHEREx spacecraft will be provided by Ball Aerospace & Technologies while the payload is being developed by Caltech and NASA's Jet Propulsion Laboratory. The Korea Astronomy and Space Science Institute will supply additional support in the way of a non-flight cryogenic test chamber.

History 
The SPHEREx proposal was submitted to NASA on 19 December 2014, and it was selected for further conceptual development (Phase A) on 30 July 2015 for the Small Explorer program (SMEX). The detailed concept study report was submitted to NASA on 19 July 2016, but it was not selected for SMEX. An enhanced version of SPHEREx was submitted on 15 December 2016 as a Medium-Class Explorer (MIDEX), and it was selected as a finalist in August 2017, along two other competing missions: Arcus, and Fast Infrared Exoplanet Spectroscopy Survey Explorer (FINESSE). Each team received US$2 million to refine their mission concepts over nine-months.

SPHEREx was selected as the winner in February 2019, and the mission has been approved to proceed with construction and launch.  Medium-Class Explorer mission costs are capped at US$250 million, not including the launch vehicle. As of April 2020, the preliminary total cost of the mission is approximately US$395 million to US$427 million. The 2020 estimates include the costs of the launch vehicle and NASA reserves that are not part of the cost cap. The launch was targeted for 17 June 2024.

On 7 January 2021, NASA announced that the mission has entered Phase C, which means that the early design plans have been approved and teams can begin the final design and assemble hardware and software; and that launch is expected between June 2024 and April 2025. On 4 February 2021, NASA announced they had selected the SpaceX Falcon 9 to launch the spacecraft, and total cost of the launch would be US$98.8 million. In August 2022 NASA announced that the 4 microsatellites of the PUNCH constellation will be launched as rideshare payloads together with SPHEREx in April 2025.

References

External links 
 Exoplanet Science with SPHEREx’s All-Sky Spectro-photometric Survey in the Near-Infrared (PDF)

Explorers Program
Space telescopes
2025 in spaceflight